Baisha is a town of Yichuan County, Henan, China. , it has 26 villages under its administration.

References

Township-level divisions of Henan
Yichuan County, Henan